The Church of the Transfiguration is a Roman Catholic parish located at 25 Mott Street on the northwest corner of Mosco Street (formerly Park Street) in the Chinatown neighborhood of Manhattan, New York City. The parish is under the authority of the Archdiocese of New York and is staffed by the Maryknoll order.

History and description
The church was built in 1801 in the Georgian style of architecture for the Zion English Lutheran Church., a Lutheran congregation that subsequently converted en masse to the Protestant Episcopal Church. The church then became known as Zion Protestant Episcopal Church. It was rebuilt after a major fire in 1815 which gutted the church and 35 dwellings in the surrounding Five Points neighborhood. The church was rebuilt thanks to the effort of congregation member Peter Lorillard.

The Episcopal congregation sold the building in 1853 to the Roman Catholic Archdiocese of New York, which transferred to this building the congregation of the "Church of the Transfiguration" which was then located on Chambers Street.

The church is one of four on the Lower East Side built from Manhattan schist.  The AIA Guide to New York City describes it as "[A] Georgian church with Gothic (small-paned double-hung) windows ... with Gothic tracery ... Dressed Manhattan schist makes neat building blocks, with brownstone detail."  A copper-covered octagonal tower designed by Henry Engelbert was added to the church building in 1868, when the Gothic windows are assumed to have been added as well. The church was designated a New York City landmark in 1966, and was added to the National Register of Historic Places in 1980.

Parish

The Church of the Transfiguration had its origins in 1827, when the Rev. Felix Varela y Morales purchased the former Episcopalian "Christ Church" on Ann Street to serve as a home for the fourth Catholic parish established on Manhattan.  When the building on Ann Street became unsafe to use, in 1836 Father Varela purchased a former Scottish Presbyterian church on Chambers Street, renaming it the "Church of the Transfiguration", and his congregation moved there.  The congregation had outgrown its Chambers Street church by 1853, leading to the purchase by the (then) Roman Catholic Diocese of New York of the larger church building on Mott Street to serve as a new home for the parish.   The parish therefore has the unusual history not only of having been located in three different locations in the city, but each time having as its home a building originally built as a Protestant church.

Over the years it has continued to serve the Irish, Italian and more recently Chinese immigrant communities.

Today, this parish serves an almost entirely Chinese congregation.  It offers Sunday masses in English, Cantonese and Mandarin, and has a Catholic School open to all religions.  The Maryknoll Fathers and Brothers who staff the parish belong to an order that has historical roots in overseas missions to China in particular and the entire world in general.  Because the Maryknoll Order is dedicated to overseas mission, this Chinese Roman Catholic Parish has the unique designation as the only parish that is entirely staffed by Maryknollers.  Among its pastors was Bishop John W. Comber, M.M. (1967-1969), a Maryknoll Missionary who had served in Fushun.

Transfiguration School
Transfiguration School is the Catholic parochial school linked to the Church of the Transfiguration.  It was founded in 1832 by Varela and became open to children of all faiths in 1969.

The school has high academic standards and won the National Blue Ribbon Schools Award in 2011.  Focusing on expansion, the school has launched a five-year campaign that will end in 2016. By that time, there will be a student body of 700 across three campuses. The campuses are the Early Childhood Campus, Transfiguration Lower School, and Transfiguration Upper School. Transfiguration Lower School is the school connected to the Church of the Transfiguration. Transfiguration Upper School's current campus was St. James Elementary School's former campus, where New York State governor Al Smith received his only education.

Mergers
In 1967 St. Joachim's Church on Roosevelt Street, which was founded in 1888 by the Scalabrini Fathers, was demolished to make way for a city housing development on Park Row. The parish was merged with the nearby St. Joseph's Church, founded around 1923, also by the Scalabrini Fathers. In 2007, St. James Parish on James Street, established in 1835, merged with the nearby Parish of St. Joseph to create the combined Parish of St. Joseph/St. James. In 2015 St. Joseph/St. James was merged with the Church of the Transfiguration.

References

External links
 

1801 establishments in New York (state)
19th-century Episcopal church buildings
19th-century Roman Catholic church buildings in the United States
Chinatown, Manhattan
Churches on the National Register of Historic Places in New York (state)
Five Points, Manhattan
Former Episcopal church buildings in New York City
Former Lutheran churches in New York (state)
Georgian Revival architecture in New York City
Gothic Revival church buildings in New York City
Henry Engelbert church buildings
New York City Designated Landmarks in Manhattan
Properties of religious function on the National Register of Historic Places in Manhattan
Roman Catholic churches completed in 1815
Roman Catholic churches in Manhattan
Stone churches in New York City